Pinball Hall of Fame: The Gottlieb Collection is a pinball video game developed by FarSight Studios and published by Crave Entertainment. The tables featured in the game are recreations of real tables. A revised edition of the PlayStation 2 version of the game was later released as Gottlieb Pinball Classics in Europe and Australia by System 3 under their Play It label. This expanded version featured three additional tables, and was subsequently released in North America on the Wii and PlayStation Portable under its original title.

Tables
The following pinball machines are included in all versions of the game:
 Ace High (1957)
 Big Shot (1973)
 Central Park (1966)
 Genie (1979)
 Black Hole (1981)
 Victory (1987)
 Tee'd Off (1993)
The following extras are included in all versions of the game:
 Play-Boy (1932)
 Xolten (A fortune teller machine which predicts the player's future)
 Love Meter (A love tester machine which evaluates the player's dating eligibility)
The following are included in the PSP, Wii and Gottlieb Pinball Classics versions of the game:
 Goin' Nuts (1983)
 El Dorado City of Gold (1984)
 Strikes n' Spares (1995) (A redemption game)

Reception

Pinball Hall of Fame: The Gottlieb Collection received "mixed or average" reviews from critics, according to Metacritic. GameSpot gave the console versions a 7.2 out of 10 while the PlayStation Portable version was given a 7.1 out of 10.

Sequel

A sequel, titled Pinball Hall of Fame: The Williams Collection was released on the Nintendo 3DS, PlayStation 2, PlayStation 3, PlayStation Portable, Wii and Xbox 360 on February 26, 2008, September 22, 2009 and September 23, 2011 respectively.

See also
 Pinball Hall of Fame
 Pinball Hall of Fame: The Williams Collection
 The Pinball Arcade
 Microsoft Pinball Arcade

References

2004 video games
GameCube games
PlayStation 2 games
PlayStation Network games
PlayStation Portable games
Xbox games
Wii games
Pinball video games
FarSight Studios games
Crave Entertainment games
Video games developed in the United States
Gottlieb games
Multiplayer and single-player video games